Andrew Jackson Baxley (July 4, 1884 – December 10, 1950) was an American character actor of the 1930s and 1940s. He appeared in over 100 films over his career, many in unnamed, un-credited roles. Occasionally he would receive small, named roles, and rarely a featured role.

Life and career
Born in Dallas, Texas, prior to becoming an actor Baxley worked in circuses and carnivals as a side-show barker.

He made his film debut at the age of 47 in the 1930 Greta Garbo classic, Anna Christie, as a barker at Coney Island. It would be a character he portrayed frequently in films. Some of his more prominent roles included: Mathews in International Crime (1938); Judge Culpepper in Mr. Celebrity (1941); Sheriff Verner in Gallant Lady (1942); and in the featured role of Bill White in The Kid from Gower Gulch (1949), in one of his final performances.

Death

Select filmography

(Per AFI database)

 Possessed (1931)
 Faithless (1932)
 Straight Is the Way  (1934)
 Murder in the Private Car  (1934)
 Good Dame  (1934)
 Sadie McKee  (1934)
 The Gay Bride  (1934)
 Whirlpool  (1934)
 Now I'll Tell  (1934)
 Man on the Flying Trapeze  (1935)
 Our Little Girl  (1935)
 Baby Face Harrington  (1935)
 O'Shaughnessy's Boy  (1935)
 The Affair of Susan  (1935)
 Carnival  (1935)
 Poppy  (1936)
 Moonlight Murder  (1936) 
 San Francisco  (1936)
 The Great Ziegfeld  (1936)
 Man of the People  (1937)
 Wells Fargo  (1937)
 Murder Goes to College  (1937)
 Merry-Go-Round of 1938  (1937)
 My Dear Miss Aldrich  (1937)
 Love Is News  (1937)
 Woman Chases Man  (1937)
 You're Only Young Once  (1937)
 Double Wedding  (1937)
 Rascals  (1938)
 Spring Madness  (1938)
 International Crime  (1938)
 Slightly Honorable  (1939)
 Zenobia  (1939) 
 The Arizona Wildcat  (1939)
 Stronger Than Desire  (1939)
 The Gracie Allen Murder Case  (1939)
 Young Tom Edison  (1940)
 When the Daltons Rode  (1940)
 Strike Up the Band  (1940)
 Mr. Celebrity  (1941)
 Lucky Jordan  (1942)
 City of Silent Men  (1942)
 Gallant Lady  (1942)
 The Magnificent Ambersons  (1942)
 Mrs. Wiggs of the Cabbage Patch  (1942)
 This Gun for Hire  (1942)
 A Tornado in the Saddle  (1942)
 True to Life  (1943)
 My Buddy  (1944)
 Rationing  (1944)
 Sweethearts of the U.S.A. (1944)
 And the Angels Sing  (1944)
 Wilson  (1944)
 Along Came Jones  (1945)
 Don Juan Quilligan  (1945)
 Riders of the Dawn  (1945)
 Thrill of a Romance  (1945)
 Canyon Passage  (1946)
 Song of the Sierras  (1946)
 California  (1947)
 Desperate  (1947)
 The Egg and I  (1947)
 Framed  (1947)
 The Last Round-Up  (1947)
 Out of the Blue  (1947) 
 Rainbow Over the Rockies  (1947)
 The Sea of Grass  (1947)
 High Wall  (1948)
 The Lady from Shanghai  (1948)
 Summer Holiday  (1948)
 Two Guys from Texas  (1948)
 The Kid from Gower Gulch  (1949)
 Battling Marshal  (1950) (as A. J. Baxley)

References

External links
 

1884 births
1950 deaths
American male silent film actors
American male film actors
Burials at Forest Lawn Memorial Park (Glendale)
20th-century American male actors
Male actors from Dallas